Majidiya Islamiya Intermediate College (MIC) in Allahabad, India, is one of the oldest schools in the Indian state of Uttar Pradesh providing higher secondary education. It is affiliated with the UP Board of Secondary Education, Allahabad (Uttar Pradesh Madhyamic Shiksha Parishad, Allahabad).

Geography
It is located in the south west part of Allahabad city and divides the neighborhoods of Atala near Goal Park, Allahabad (to its north) and Rasool Pur (to its south). Kareli lies to the west while Mira pur to the east.

Education offered
The main college is a boys' school providing education from 6th to 12th. It also has a primary (1st to 5th) school for boys and a high school (1st to 12th) for girls.

Notable alumni
 Dr Syed Zahoor Qasim, scientist

Primary schools in Uttar Pradesh
High schools and secondary schools in Uttar Pradesh
Intermediate colleges in Uttar Pradesh
Schools in Allahabad
Educational institutions in India with year of establishment missing